Little Crosthwaite is a hamlet in the Borough of Allerdale in the English county of Cumbria.  It forms part of the civil parish of Underskiddaw.

Little Crosthwaite is located on the A591 road on the eastern shore of the Bassenthwaite Lake between Keswick and Bassenthwaite. The Calvert Trust a charity that provides disability awareness training and adventurous outdoor activities for people with disabilities has its headquarters there.

External links 

Hamlets in Cumbria
Allerdale